Jesus is a 1973 Indian Malayalam-language film directed by P. A. Thomas and starring Murali Das, Gemini Ganesan, Jayabharathi, Jayalalitha, Thikkurissy, M. N. Nambiar, K. P. Ummar, Jose Prakash, Bahadoor and V. K. Ramasamy. The film was also dubbed in Tamil and Telugu. It was Jayalalithaa's only Malayalam film to date.

Plot
King Herod has ruled Judea for over 37 years and believes himself to be supreme. When three wise men from the Far East come to visit him, he is initially pleased, but this pleasure turns to anger when he finds out that they have traveled all the way to witness the birth of the son of God. After they depart, he instructs his Prime Minister to kill all children under the age of 2 years. Herod's instructions are carried out, but they don't find the baby Jesus, born in a stable in Bethlehem. Jesus, son of Joseph and virgin Mary, has been destined to lead mankind to a better path but must face many challenges, temptations and betrayal from ones he trusted the most, including humiliation, torture, crucifixion, and resurrection.

Cast
 Muralidas as Jesus
 Gemini Ganesan as John The Baptist
 Thikkurissy Sukumaran Nair as King Herod
 K. P. Ummer as Herod Antipas
 Raji as Mary
 Ushakumari as Mary Magdalene
 Jayabharathi as Saint Veronica
 Jayalalithaa as Salome 
 Jose Prakash as Annas
 Prameela as Martha
 M. N. Nambiar as Judas
 Major Sundarrajan as Pontius Pilate
 O. A. K. Thevar as Satan
 G. K. Pillai as Caiaphas
 V. K. Ramasamy as Saint Peter
 Vincent as John the Apostle
 Innocent as a courtier in King Herod's court
 Khadeeja

Soundtrack 
The music was composed by K. J. Yesudas, M. S. Viswanathan, Alleppey Ranganath and Joseph Krishna and the lyrics were written by Sreekumaran Thampi, P. Bhaskaran, Bharanikkavu Sivakumar, Augustine Vanchimala and Vayalar Ramavarma.

References

External links 
 

1973 films
Films about Jesus
1970s Malayalam-language films
Films based on the Bible
Films based on the New Testament
Films based on the Gospels
Films set in Palestine (region)
Films set in Jerusalem
Films set in ancient Egypt
Portrayals of the Virgin Mary in film
Cultural depictions of John the Baptist
Films scored by M. S. Viswanathan
Films directed by P. A. Thomas
Portrayals of Mary Magdalene in film
Cultural depictions of Saint Peter
Film portrayals of Jesus' death and resurrection
Films about the Nativity of Jesus
Depictions of Herod the Great on film
The Devil in film
Cultural depictions of Judas Iscariot
Cultural depictions of the Biblical Magi
Cultural depictions of Paul the Apostle
Cultural depictions of Pontius Pilate
Cultural depictions of Salome
Caiaphas
Films set in the Roman Empire
Films about Christianity
Portrayals of Saint Joseph in film
Christian mass media in India